Vice Admiral Francis Pickmore RN ( 1756–24 February 1818) was a naval officer and colonial governor.

Naval career
He was born in Chester in England and joined the Royal Navy around 1770.

He was in service in Newfoundland when he received his commission as a lieutenant in December 1777. In June 1782 he was given his first command: HMS Vaughan moving to HMS Keppel six months later. He was promoted to Captain in September 1780 and given command of the 36-gun HMS Thalia. In 1794 he took command of the huge HMS Royal William one of the largest ships in the Royal Navy, with 84 guns and a crew of 750 men.

in August 1812 he reached the rank of vice-admiral. He was appointed governor of Newfoundland in 1816. Pickmore's term was marked by strife and severe economic depression that had hit the island following the Napoleonic wars and influx of Irish immigrants. Pickmore is noted as the first governor of Newfoundland to stay the winter. He died in St. John's and Captain John Bowker, a senior officer under Pickmore's command and commander of Pickmore's flagship Sir Francis Drake, acted as governor until Governor Sir Charles Hamilton arrived.

His body was returned to England for burial.

See also 
 Governors of Newfoundland
 List of people from Newfoundland and Labrador

References

External links
Biography at Government House The Governorship of Newfoundland and Labrador

1756 births
1818 deaths
Royal Navy vice admirals
Governors of Newfoundland Colony
People from Chester
Military personnel from Chester